Olga Tomilova (1822-1894), was a Russian Empire pedagogue. She was the principal of the Smolny Institute in Saint Petersburg in 1875–1886. She graduated from the Smolny Institute with the highest honors in 1839 and was a lady in waiting prior to her marriage to the estate owner Roman Tomilov (1812-1864). As a widow, she became a lady in waiting and in 1872 deputy principal of the institute. She was an innovator who reformed the institute with ideas she had observed in Western Europe, were formal education was at this time made available for women. Among her innovation was training in practical craftsmanship.

Sources
Шереметьевский В. В. Русский провинциальный некрополь. — 1914.

1822 births
1894 deaths
Educators from the Russian Empire
Ladies-in-waiting from the Russian Empire